July Kyaw (born 21 July 1999) is a Burmese footballer who plays as a forward for the Myanmar women's national team.

International goals

See also
List of Myanmar women's international footballers

References

1999 births
Living people
Women's association football forwards
Burmese women's footballers
Sportspeople from Yangon
Myanmar women's international footballers